Rebecca Llewellyn (born 5 October 1985) is a retired tennis player from Wales.

In her career, she won one title in singles and seven in doubles on the ITF Women's Circuit. She reached career-high rankings of world No. 280 in singles and No. 309 in doubles. She has not competed professionally since 2007.

Career

Playing style
Rebecca began playing tennis aged seven in school. In 2003, she graduated from Haileybury High School.

She played right-handed and cited her favourite shots as the backhand and the volley. Her preferred playing surfaces were grass and clay.

Junior years (1999–2003)
Llewellyn played her first match on the junior ITF circuit in February 1999 and her last in June 2003 in the Junior Wimbledon Championships. Her best performances in singles came when she reached two semifinals of lower-tier junior events in 2000. She also reached the quarterfinals in one other event. In terms of Grand Slam success, her best singles result came at Wimbledon in 2000 when she won two matches to qualify and then went on to reach the second round. By the end of her junior career, she ended with a singles win–loss record of 11–14 and a career-high ranking of world No. 234 (achieved 25 June 2001).

As a junior doubles player she was a runner-up on one occasion. She was also a doubles semifinalist on another occasion. Rebecca competed in doubles at a Grand Slam only once, at the 2001 Wimbledon Championships, where she and compatriot Katie O'Brien were knocked out in round one. She ended her junior career with a win–loss record of 5–7 in doubles and a career-high doubles ranking of world No. 410 (achieved 16 April 2001).

Professional years
Llewellyn took part in the 2005 Wimbledon Championships, but lost 0–6, 1–6 to the fifth seed Svetlana Kuznetsova. In doing so, she became the first player from Wales to compete in singles since Sarah Loosemore in 1992. She also competed in the doubles event at the 2005 and the 2006 Wimbledon Championships, losing in the first round each time.

ITF Circuit titles (8)

Singles (1)

Doubles (7)

ITF runner-ups (4)

Singles (1)

Doubles (3)

References

External links
 
 

1985 births
Living people
British female tennis players
Welsh female tennis players
Sportspeople from Cardiff
People from Welwyn